Hotarionomus ilocanus is a species of beetle in the family Cerambycidae. It was described by Heller in 1899, originally under the genus Otarionomus. It is known from the Philippines.

References

Lamiini
Beetles described in 1899